Rungsiodes is a genus of moths belonging to the family Tineidae. It contains only one species, Rungsiodes stenopterella, which is found in Morocco.

References

Tineidae
Monotypic moth genera
Endemic fauna of Morocco
Moths of Africa
Tineidae genera